Lorraine I Hanson (born 22 April 1965) is a British female former sprinter who competed mainly in the 400 metres.

Athletics career
She ran her lifetime best of 50.93 secs at the 1991 World Championships in Tokyo, which at the time moved her to fourth on the British all-time list, and as of 2018 ranks her 13th. At the same championship, she was a member of the British 4 x 400 metres relay quartet (along with Phylis Smith, Sally Gunnell and Linda Keough) that finished fourth in the British record time of 3:22.01; a time that would stand as the British record for 16 years. 

She also competed in the women's 400 metres at the 1992 Barcelona Olympics. She represented England in the 400 metres hurdles event, at the 1990 Commonwealth Games in Auckland, New Zealand.

International competitions

References

External links
 

1965 births
Living people
Athletes (track and field) at the 1992 Summer Olympics
British female sprinters
Olympic athletes of Great Britain
Athletes (track and field) at the 1990 Commonwealth Games
Commonwealth Games competitors for England
20th-century British women